Zhetysu, or Jeti-Suu (Jetısu, pronounced ;  Jeti-Suu,, meaning "seven rivers"; also transcribed Zhetisu, Jetisuw, Jetysu, Jeti-su, Jity-su, Жетысу, Джетысу etc. and Yedi-su in Turkish, هفت‌آب Haft-āb in Persian, Mongolian: “Долоон ус”, and Семире́чье Semiréchie in Russian), is a historical name of a part of Central Asia corresponding to the southeastern part of modern Kazakhstan. It owes its name, meaning "seven rivers" (literally, "seven waters") in Kazakh, to the rivers that flow from the southeast into Lake Balkhash. Zhetysu falls into today's Almaty Region and other South-Eastern parts of Kazakhstan and some parts of Northern Kyrgyzstan.

Geography

The lands of the 19th-century Semirechye Oblast included the steppes south of Lake Balkhash and parts of the Tian Shan Mountains around Lake Issyk Kul. The province had an area of 147,300 km², and was bounded by the province of Semipalatinsk on the north, by China (Xinjiang) on the east and south, and by the former Russian provinces of Fergana, Syr-darya, and Akmolinsk on the west.

The Dzungarian Alatau Mountains, which separated it from the Chinese region of Kulja, extend south-west towards the river Ili, with an average height of 2,700 m (9,000 ft) above the sea, several isolated snow-clad peaks reaching 3,400 to 4,300 m (11,000 to 14,000 ft). In the south, the region embraces the intricate systems of the Ala-Tau and the Tian Shan. Two ranges of the former, the Trans-Ili Ala-tau and the Terskey Ala-tau, stretch along the north shore of Lake Issyk Kul, both ranging from 3,000 to 4,600 m (10,000 to 15,000 ft) and both partially snow-clad. South of the lake, two ranges of the Tian Shan, separated by the valley of the Naryn, stretch in the same direction, lifting up their icy peaks to 1,800 and 2,400 m (6,000 and 8,000 ft); while westwards from the lake the precipitous slopes of the Alexander chain, 2,700 to 3,000 m (9,000 to 10,000 ft) high, with peaks rising 900 to 1,200 m (3,000 to 4,000 ft) higher, extend into the former province of Syr-darya (containing the southern Kazakh cities of Chimkent, Auliye-ata and Turkestan). Another mountain complex of much lower elevation runs north-westwards from the Trans-Ili Ala-tau towards the southern extremity of Lake Balkhash. In the north, where the province bordered Semipalatinsk, it included the western parts of the Tarbagatai range, the summits of which (3,000 m or 10,000 ft) do not reach the limit of perpetual snow. The remainder of the province consisted of a fertile steppe in the north-east (Sergiopol), and vast uninhabitable sand-steppes on the south of Lake Balkhash. Southwards from these at the foot of the mountains and at the entrance to the valleys, there are rich areas of fertile land.

Climate

The climate in Zhetysu is thoroughly continental. In the Balkhash steppes the winter is very cold. The lake freezes every year, with temperatures falling to −11 °C (13 °F). In the Ala-kul steppes the winds blow away the snow. The passage from winter to spring is very abrupt, and the steppes are rapidly clothed with vegetation, which, however, is soon scorched by the sun. Average temperatures at Almaty (733 m, 2,405 ft high) are: for the year , for January −8 °C (17 °F), for July 23 °C (74 °F). At Przhevalsk (1,660 m, 5,450 ft): for the year 2.5 °C (36.5 °F), for January −5 °C (23 °F), for July 17 °C (63 °F); still higher in the mountains, at Naryn (2,100 m, 6,900 ft), the average temperature  for the year is only 6.5 °C (43.7 °F), for January −17 °C (1.4 °F), for July 18 °C (64.4 °F).

Bodies of water
The most important river is the Ili, which enters Zhetysu from the Tian Shan mountains of China's Ili Kazakh Autonomous Prefecture in northern Xinjiang, and drains it for 250 km before it enters Lake Balkhash. The Chu River also rises in the Tian Shan mountains and flows north-westwards through the former Akmolinsk province of the Governor-Generalship of the Steppes.  The Naryn River flows south-westwards along a longitudinal valley of the Tian Shan, and enters the Fergana Valley to join the Syr Darya.  The major lakes of the area include Lake Balkhas (or Denghiz) and Lake Ala Kul, which was connected with Balkash in the post-Pliocene period but now stands some hundred feet higher, connected by a chain of smaller lakes with Sissyk Kul, Lake Issyk-Kul, and the alpine lakes of Son-Kul and Chatyr-Kul.

Population
The population was estimated in 1906 as 1,080,700. Kazakhs formed 76% of the population, Russians 14%, Taranchi (Uyghurs) 5.7%.

History and administration
History of the central steppe has an outline history with links to the many peoples who lived in this area.

In the VI-III vv. BC. e. the Iranian Sakas (Scythians) established their first state, whose center was in Zhetysu. In the mid 6th century, the Turkic nomads subordinated Zhetysu, Central Kazakhstan, and Khorezm.

 

The area belonged to Dzungar Khanate in the 17th century. When Dzungar Khanate was eliminated by Qing China in 1755 the area formed part of empire and was under the direct rule by General of Ili, headquartered at the fort of Huiyuan (the so-called "Manchu Kuldja", or Yili), 30 km west of Ghulja (Yining). Most of Zhetysu was annexed by the Russian Empire from Qing China in 1854, before the outbreak of the Crimean War, which delayed the southern advance. The territorial change was confirmed by the Treaty of Tarbagatai, where Russia gained about 350,000 square miles of territory at the expense of Chinese Xinjiang. The two major Russian fortresses and garrisons in the region, Verny and Pishpek, were founded in 1854 on the sites of former Kokandian fortresses on the Steppe frontier.

From 1867 to 1884 this province was made part of Russian Turkestan, and from then until 1899 it was incorporated in the Governor-Generalship of the Steppes before reverting to Russian Turkestan that year. The province was divided into six districts, the chief towns of which were Verny (the capital), Jarkent, Kopal, Pishpek, Przhevalsk and Sergiopol.

Before the Russian revolution the chief occupation of the Russians, the Taranchis and the Dzungars, and partly also of the Kazakhs of the region, was agriculture. The most important crops were wheat, barley, oats, millet, rice and potatoes. A variety of oil-bearing plants and green fodder, as also cotton, hemp, flax and poppies, were grown. Livestock breeding was very extensively carried on by the Kazakhs, namely, horses, cattle, sheep, camels, goats and pigs. Orchards and fruit gardens were well developed; and the Russian Imperial crown maintained two model gardens. Bee-keeping was widely spread. The factories consisted of flour-mills, distilleries, tanneries and tobacco works; but a great many domestic trades, including carpet-weaving and the making of felt goods, saddlery and iron goods, were carried on, among both the settled inhabitants and the nomadic Kazakhs. There was also trade with China, valued at less than half a million sterling annually in 1911. From 1905, after the Russian-Japanese war and the construction of the Trans-Aral Railway, the settlement of Russian people in the area increased greatly under the guidance of the new Migration Department in St. Petersburg (Переселенческое Управление). The province was administered by Vasile Balabanov under General Alexander Dutov until the Bolshevik take-over in 1921, when both Dutov and Balabanov escaped to China.

After the Central Asian Revolt of 1916 and the Russian Revolution of 1917 the Provisional Government's authority in the region collapsed. Approximately 2,500 Russian settlers are thought to have been killed by the Kazakhs in the violence that followed in Zhetysu, and this was followed by equally bloody reprisals against the nomadic population, led by the (all-Russian) workers' & soldiers' Soviets in Tashkent and Verny. Bolshevik control was reimposed in 1918-21 in a series of campaigns led by Mikhail Frunze, after whom the town of Pishpek in Zhetysu was renamed. In 1924, Zhetysu was incorporated in the southern portion of the new Kazakh ASSR by the new Soviet Union, and, in 1931, this was made a full Soviet Republic and nominally independent of Russia. In 1936 the Kyrgyz ASSR, which incorporated the southern portion of Zhetysu, also became a Soviet Republic.  In late 1991, both republics declared their independence from the Soviet Union, forming the new nations of Kazakhstan and Kyrgyzstan respectively.

Derived names
The name of Onsu County (Wensu) in nearby Aksu Prefecture, Xinjiang, China similarly means "ten water" in Uyghur and other Turkic languages- both names consist of a number followed by 'su' (river; water). The name 'Aksu' in nearby Aksu Prefecture is Turkic for 'white water'. Kizilsu, name of a river and of a nearby prefecture in Xinjiang, means “red water”.

References

Miracles of the Zhetysu (Russian)

Central Asia
History of Kazakhstan
History of Kyrgyzstan
Turkic toponyms